is a Japanese manga series by Sumiko Kamimura. The story has been adapted into two original video animations (OVAs) released by Toei Video, a subsidiary of the Toei Company.

Because of the sexual content the series was one of the manga placed on "Harmful manga" lists by local and national governmental agencies. The negative publicity resulted in Kodansha discontinuing the series.

Plot
The story focuses on Yusuke Yamamoto, the teenage son of two gynaecologists. As a boy, he was almost castrated by his two childhood friends, the twin sisters Yuka and Rika Nakamura, his neighbours, which is why he is afraid of women. Also as a child, he saved the twins from an attacking dog. They grow up with a dream that turns Yusuke's life upside down. At the beginning of the story, they re-appear at the home of Yusuke. His father invites the young women in, to live with them, hoping they will heal his son's gynophobia. The therapeutic benefits of this intended treatment are not entirely clear from the series of, sexually tinted, events that unfold.

Manga
The manga was serialized in Monthly Shōnen Magazine, published by Kodansha, from 1988 to 1990 but discontinued after it met opposition due to the depiction of nudity and sexually tinted content. The manga was re-released by Shōbunkan in 1994 to 1995.

Characters

The elder twin who keeps her hair down, and is more modest and reserved.

The younger twin who keeps her hair in a ponytail, she is more playful and is more direct and shamelessly presents herself to Yuusuke in lewd situations.
Yuusuke's Father

He is the owner of a gynaecology clinic.

Episode list

Reception
In a preview for the, February 23, 1990, release of the OVA, the reviewer for the January 1990 issue of Animage magazine notes that 24 year old Kamimura's popular manga is a little naughty but that the female creator has also attracted a loyal fan base among women despite its erotic content.

Writing a review for Asian Trash Cinema, Jim McLennan observed about the first part of the video adaptation: "The delight of this episode is its sheer, unrelenting, cheerful tackiness. Yes the girls are utter airheads but charges of sexism must be partly countered by the fact that the original manga was created by a woman, Junko Uemura. In addition, Yusuke is just as socially inadequate in his way, which is doubly amusing given that he is a parody of the likely intended target audience."

References

External links
 
 

1988 manga
1990 anime OVAs
Harem anime and manga
J.C.Staff
Kodansha franchises
Kodansha manga
Shōnen manga